The Victorian Football League night series, also known during its history by a variety of sponsored names, was an Australian rules football tournament held annually between 1956 and 1971, and again on three occasions in the late 1970's and 1980's. For most years the series was a consolation series, played on weekday nights each September as a knock-out tournament amongst teams which failed to reach the Victorian Football League finals.

History
The Night Premiership was first established in 1956, contested in September as a three-round knock-out tournament amongst the eight VFL teams who did not make the final four, based on a similar post-season night competition which had been established in the South Australian National Football League (SANFL) in 1954. All games were played at the South Melbourne Cricket Ground, which was the only ground equipped to host night games. Despite the fact that not all VFL teams participated, the first season's average crowd was 20,000 for the seven matches played, and a crowd of 33,120 watched the first night Grand Final.

The series was expanded in 1957 to include all twelve teams. The four teams which contested the VFL finals entered the Night Series after their VFL premiership season was finished, resulting in the night series running more than two weeks beyond the end of the day premiership. This was ultimately not successful, and the VFL elected to return to the original format in 1958, and remained under this format until 1971.

Interest in the night series, particularly among the clubs, began to reduce in the late 1960s as the home-and-away season was extended from eighteen rounds to twenty rounds in 1968, then again to twenty-two rounds in 1970. Additionally, in 1972, the VFL switched from a final four to a final-five finals system, leaving only seven teams available to contest the Night Series. Consequently, the Night Series was abolished after the 1971 season.

The series returned in 1977 and 1978, as the VFL went head-to-head with the NFL Night Series in those years, the VFL clubs having left the latter competition after 1976. The VFL won out in the battle, with the last NFL series taking place in 1979, the same year that the VFL-owned AFC Night Series commenced operations. With the AFC series underway, the VFL Night Series ended following the 1978 series, though it returned for one final year in 1987. These series in 1977, 1978 and 1987 were played by all the VFL clubs.

During its history, the Night Series was used to trial rule changes. Two particular rules which were trialled and later introduced were the free kick for kicking out of bounds on the full (trialled in 1966, introduced in the VFL in 1969 and nationally in 1970) and the centre square to control congestion at centre bounces (trialled in 1966, introduced nationally in 1973).

The consolation night series is generally considered to be of equivalent importance as the Australian Football Championships Night Series (1979–1986) and the Australian Football League pre-season competition (1988–2013), and records relating to the three competitions are often combined.

Competition names
During its history, the night series was known by the following sponsored names:
1965–1969 – Golden Fleece Cup
1970 – Radiant Cup
1971 – H. J. Heinz Cup
1977-1978 – Amco-Herald Cup
1987 – National Panasonic Cup

Winners

Most night series wins

See also
 List of Australian Football League pre-season and night series premiers

References

Defunct Australian rules football competitions in Victoria (Australia)